The Taipo River is a river of the central West Coast Region of New Zealand's South Island. It flows north from its sources west of Mount Rolleston, fed by the waters of several mountain streams. After some 15 kilometres it turns northeast to flow past the Bald Range before reaching the valley of the Taramakau River into which it flows 35 kilometres 
east of Hokitika.

See also
List of rivers of New Zealand

References

Rivers of the West Coast, New Zealand
Westland District
Rivers of New Zealand